Pauls Valley is a train station in Pauls Valley, Oklahoma, United States, served by Amtrak's  train.

The station shares property with the former depot built in 1903 by the Atchison, Topeka and Santa Fe Railway, which the street both stations are located on was named for.  The current station building opened in June 2002 and was primarily funded through assistance made available via the Federal Transportation Equity Act for the 21st Century. Architecturally, it is similar to the adjacent historic depot.

Of the five Oklahoma stations served by Amtrak, Pauls Valley was the fourth busiest in fiscal year 2012, boarding or detraining 5,706 passengers during the year.

Gallery

References

External links 

Pauls Valley Amtrak Station & Former Santa Fe Station (USA Rail Guide -- Train Web)

Amtrak stations in Oklahoma
Atchison, Topeka and Santa Fe Railway stations
Railway stations in the United States opened in 1903
1903 establishments in Oklahoma Territory